Say I Do is an American reality television series developed by Scout Productions for Netflix. Each episode features a team of three professionals, Jeremiah Brent in the field of design, Thai Nguyen in the field of fashion, and Gabriele Bertaccini in the field of cuisine, helping someone surprise their partner with a dream wedding in less than a week. From the creators of Queer Eye, the 8-episode first season was available on Netflix from July 1, 2020.

Cast 
 Jeremiah Brent – design expert
 Thai Nguyen – fashion expert
 Gabriele Bertaccini – food expert

Episodes

Series overview

Season 1

Production
The series was created and executive produced by David Collins of Scout Productions. Larissa A.K. Matsson, Rob Eric, Michael Williams also executive produced with Erin Coan co-executive producing.

Principal photography for the season took place in summer and autumn 2019 across northern Kentucky, Ohio, and Indiana, mostly in and around the Greater Cincinnati and Indianapolis metropolitan areas. Local vendors were used to supply the weddings.

Release
A trailer for Say I Do was released in June 2020. The episodes were available on Netflix from July 1, 2020.

References

External links
 
 

2020 American television series debuts
2020s American LGBT-related television series
2020s American reality television series
2020s LGBT-related reality television series
American LGBT-related reality television series
English-language Netflix original programming
Gay-related television shows
Television shows filmed in Ohio
Television shows set in Indiana
Television shows set in Kentucky
Television shows set in Ohio
Wedding television shows